Halavagalu is a panchayat town of Harpanahalli taluka in Vijayanagara district in the Indian state of Karnataka.

Cities and towns in Davanagere district